The Equality Framework Directive 2000/78/EC is an EU Directive, and a major part of EU labour law which aims to combat discrimination on grounds of disability, sexual orientation, religion or belief and age in the workplace. It accompanies the Directive 2000/43/EC on equal treatment between persons irrespective of racial or ethnic origin and the Directive 2006/54/EC on equal treatment of men and women in matters of employment and occupation. It is implemented in the UK with the Equality Act 2010. Germany implemented the directive by creation of its General Act on Equal Treatment,  (AGG).

Background
Since the Treaty of Amsterdam came into force in 1999, new EU laws, or Directives, have been enacted in the area of anti-discrimination. The Directive entered into force on 2 December 2000 and gave member states three years to transpose the Directive into law, with an additional three years for legislation in the area of age and disability. In Directive 2000/43/EC, there were two exemptions in Article 15 which both applied to Northern Ireland.

"1. To tackle the under-representation of one of the major religious communities in the police service of Northern Ireland, differences in treatment regarding recruitment into that service, including its support staff, shall not constitute discrimination insofar as those differences in treatment are expressly authorised by national legislation.
2. To maintain a balance of opportunity in employment for teachers in Northern Ireland while furthering the reconciliation of historical divisions between the major religious communities there, the provisions on religion or belief in this Directive shall not apply to the recruitment of teachers in schools in Northern Ireland in so far as this is expressly authorised by national legislation."

Contents

See also
EU labour law
UK labour law
List of European Union directives

Further reading

External links
Text of the Directive
European Commission Combatting Discrimination

2000 in law
2000 in the European Union
Ageism
Anti-discrimination law in the European Union
Disability rights
European Union directives
European Union employment directives
Homophobia
Religious discrimination
2000 in LGBT history